Pseudamia is a genus of cardinalfishes native to the Indian and Pacific oceans.

Species
There are currently 7 recognized species in this genus:
 Pseudamia amblyuroptera (Bleeker, 1856) (White-jawed cardinalfish)
 Pseudamia gelatinosa J. L. B. Smith, 1956 (Gelatinous cardinalfish)
 Pseudamia hayashii J. E. Randall, Lachner & T. H. Fraser, 1985 (Hayashi's cardinalfish)
 Pseudamia nigra G. R. Allen, 1992 (Estuary cardinalfish)
 Pseudamia rubra J. E. Randall & H. Ida, 1993
 Pseudamia tarri J. E. Randall, Lachner & T. H. Fraser, 1985 (Tarr's cardinalfish)
 Pseudamia zonata J. E. Randall, Lachner & T. H. Fraser, 1985 (Paddlefish cardinalfish)

References

Pseudaminae
Fish described in 1865
Marine fish genera
Taxa named by Pieter Bleeker